"The Walk" is a 1982 song by the British new wave duo Eurythmics. It was the band's fourth single, and was included on their second album Sweet Dreams (Are Made of This).

Background 
Produced by band member David A. Stewart and Adam Williams (ex-bassist of The Selecter), the track was recorded at Eurythmics' own 8-track home studio. As with their previous three singles, it was commercially unsuccessful, though it was included on the band's platinum-selling second album Sweet Dreams (Are Made Of This) in 1983.

Several variations of the track have been released. The original 7" single featured "The Walk" (single version) and "The Walk" (part 2), whereas the 12" version included what would become the album version of the track. A fourth version, entitled "Let's Just Close Our Eyes", was released on the 12" of the band's next single "Love Is A Stranger".

Music video 
For many years, most fans were unaware that a music video had been produced for The Walk until it was released online in the early 2000s. The video, directed by Marek Budzynski, largely consists of shots of Annie Lennox (wearing a long black wig) performing to camera whilst Dave Stewart sits in the corner of a darkened room reading a newspaper. The video was produced by Julian Cole and edited by Sophie Muller, later to become a successful music video director herself. All were, at the time, first year students at the London College of Art where they met Dave and Annie via a mutual friend. The total budget for the video was £1000. The original negative and print copy quickly went missing after the single failed to achieve chart success whilst the BBC did not retain a telecine copy. The only surviving print was kept by Marek Budzynski himself, later remastered by a YouTube channel called Sterovideosubscriber and re-released online in 2017. 

The website Eurythmics Video Visionaries interviewed Marek Budzynski in 2007 who revealed that the video was shot "at a carpenter friend of Dave and Annie's who had a courtyard outside" and that the duo and their manager were largely responsible for the concept of the video.

B-sides 
The 7" and 12" releases of the single contain several B-side tracks, none of which have been released elsewhere. They were omitted from Sony BMG's remastering of Eurythmics' back catalogue in 2005 and remain unavailable on CD. "Invisible Hands" had been the working title for what became the group's Sweet Dreams (Are Made of This) album, but in the end the track was dropped from the album altogether. "Dr. Trash" was written solely by Adam Williams, thus becoming one of the few Eurythmics' recordings not to be written by Annie Lennox and Dave Stewart.

Track listings

7" vinyl 
UK: RCA 230
Side one
 "The Walk" [Single version]
Side two
 "Step on the Beast"
 "The Walk" (Part 2)

12" vinyl 
UK: RCAT 230
Side one
 "The Walk" [Album version]
Side two
 "Invisible Hands"
 "Dr. Trash"
 "The Walk" (Part 2)

References

Notes

Personnel 
 Ann Lennox – vocals, piano, melodica
 David A. Stewart – synthesizers, guitar
 Dick Cuthell – horns, trumpet solo
 The Willing Participants – male choir
 Fritz from Flex – street talk, rap on "Step on the Beast"

1982 songs
1982 singles
Eurythmics songs
Songs written by David A. Stewart
Songs written by Annie Lennox
Song recordings produced by Dave Stewart (musician and producer)
RCA Records singles